The following comparison of music education software compares general and technical information for different music education software.

For the purpose of this comparison, music education software is defined as any application which can teach music.

General

Operating system compatibility
This section lists the operating systems on which the software supports. There may be multiple versions of a player for different operating systems.

Features

Extended features

Instruments supported

See also
 Online music education
 List of music software
 List of educational software

References

Education music software comparison
Music
Music education